James Greenhoff (born 19 June 1946) is an English former footballer. He was a skilful forward and although capped five times at under-23 level, once as an over-age player, he never played for the full side, and is labelled as the finest English player never to play for England. He made nearly 600 appearances in league football. His younger brother Brian was also a professional footballer.

He started his career at Leeds United in 1963, as the club came up out of the Second Division in 1963–64, and finished as First Division runners-up in 1964–65 and 1965–66. He also played in the 1967 and 1968 Inter-Cities Fairs Cup finals. He won both the Inter-Cities Fairs Cup and League Cup in 1968, before he was sold to Birmingham City. In 1969, he made a £100,000 move to Stoke City. He won the League Cup with Stoke in 1972, and also lifted the Watney Cup in 1973. He was moved on to Manchester United in 1976, and lifted both the FA Cup and Charity Shield in 1977. He was switched to Crewe Alexandra in December 1980, before joining Port Vale via Toronto Blizzard in August 1981. He was appointed player-manager at Rochdale in March 1983, before he resigned in March 1984.

Career

Leeds United
Greenhoff was born in Barnsley. He started his career as an apprentice with Leeds United in June 1961, having impressed in the centre-half position for Barnsley Schoolboys. He was coached by Syd Owen. He turned professional at the club in August 1963, and made his senior debut as a sixteen-year-old. Leeds finished the 1963–64 season as champions of the Second Division under Don Revie's stewardship. The "Peacocks" then went on to finish 1964–65 as First Division runners-up, with champions and hated rivals Manchester United finishing above them on goal average. Leeds again finished second in 1965–66, six points behind champions Liverpool; however Greenhoff missed much of the season with an ankle injury, and a head injury sustained from a car crash. They then finished fourth in 1966–67, five points off the summit; Revie began to convert Greenhoff from a winger into a centre-forward. He turned out against Dinamo Zagreb at Elland Road in the second leg of the 1967 Inter-Cities Fairs Cup Final, a goalless draw, Leeds lost the tie 2–0 on aggregate.

Once again, they finished fourth in the First Division in 1967–68, five points behind champions Manchester City. Greenhoff played 37 games, including a memorable 7–0 victory over rivals Chelsea on 7 October. He went on to appear in the League Cup final in 1968 after recovering from a knee injury; United beat Arsenal 1–0 thanks to a twenty-yard strike from Terry Cooper. Greenhoff went on to score four of Leeds' nineteen goals past minnows CA Spora Luxembourg in the 1967–68 instalment of the Inter-Cities Fairs Cup. He also appeared as a half-time substitute in the first leg of the final, a 1–0 home win over Ferencvárosi TC, which was enough to secure Leeds the trophy after a goalless draw in Budapest. Greenhoff played a total of 136 games for Leeds in league and cup, scoring 36 goals.

Birmingham City
He was bought by Birmingham City manager Stan Cullis in August 1968, who paid the Yorkshire club a £70,000 fee. The transfer came as a surprise to many Leeds fans. Greenhoff made a huge impact at Birmingham, scoring fifteen goals in 36 games (in all competitions) as the "Blues" finished 1968–69 seventh in the Second Division. During the campaign he scored four goals in a 5–4 win over Fulham at St Andrew's on 5 October. Despite this, Cullis told him that he was not scoring enough goals.

Stoke City
In August 1969, he left Birmingham for Tony Waddington's Stoke City in a deal worth £100,000, which was a club record for Stoke. He made the switch despite late interest from Everton. He hit nine goals in 37 games in 1969–70, a tally beaten by strike partners Harry Burrows and John Ritchie. He slotted in seamlessly in the team, connecting Ritchie with the midfield by feeding off Ritchie's knock-downs and bringing the wide players into the game. In 1970–71 he hit ten goals in 43 games, appearing in Stoke's FA Cup semi-final defeat to eventual winners Arsenal. He missed an easy chance that would have put Stoke 3–0 ahead, and in an interview in 2011 he said the miss "still gets to me".

He played for the "Potters" at Wembley against Chelsea in the 1972 Football League Cup Final, which ended in a 2–1 win for Stoke – the only major trophy in the club's history. He also helped the club to the FA Cup semi-finals in 1972, his goal at Old Trafford cancelling out George Best's effort, and earning Stoke a replay, which they won. The win over Manchester United left Stoke again facing Arsenal in the semi-finals. A 1–1 draw at Villa Park led to a replay at Goodison Park; Greenhoff scored for City in the replay but Arsenal won the game 2–1 after John Radford scored from a clear offside position. Former club Leeds beat the "Gunners" in the final. Overall, he played a massive 54 games in 1971–72, scoring sixteen goals, two fewer than John Ritchie.

He scored twenty goals in 46 appearances in 1972–73, making him the club's top-scorer. These goals included a hat-trick at home to Manchester City on 23 September, and a brace against City at Maine Road in a 3–2 defeat in the FA Cup. He hit ten goals in 44 games in 1973–74, not including his brace against Hull City in the final of the Watney Cup at the Victoria Ground. Greenhoff then began to play to the best of his abilities with the arrival of Alan Hudson. He scored fifteen goals in 47 games in 1974–75, making him the club's top-scorer for a second time after he outscored Terry Conroy and Geoff Hurst by two and four goals respectively. A volley against former club Birmingham in December 1974 was voted ITV's goal of the season. He hit thirteen goals in 46 games in 1975–76, making him the club's joint-top scorer along with Ian Moores. England manager Don Revie picked Greenhoff to play against Wales in March 1976, but he was unable to play due to it clashing with a league fixture, and never got another chance at international level.

After three goals in sixteen games in 1976–77, he was sold to Tommy Docherty's Manchester United in November 1976 for £120,000; with Stoke needing the money to pay a bill for £250,000 to repair the Victoria Ground following a powerful wind-storm. Though Docherty intended him to play alongside Stuart Pearson, the move also meant that he would play alongside his brother, Brian Greenhoff. He scored a total of 97 goals for Stoke in 338 league and cup starts, putting him ninth in the club's overall goalscoring charts. A legend at the club, many Stoke fans consider him to be the greatest England player never to win a senior cap.

Manchester United
He scored twelve goals in 34 games for United in 1976–77, bagging a hat-trick against Newcastle United on 19 February. However, he greatest contribution would be in the FA Cup. He scored both United's goals in a 2–1 win over Southampton in a Fifth Round replay, before he put the "Red Devils" into the final by scoring past former club Leeds in a 2–1 semi-final victory at Hillsborough. He then went on to score the winner in the final after getting in the way of Lou Macari's wayward shot; in doing so he denied opponents and bitter rivals Liverpool the treble.

He appeared in the 1977 FA Charity Shield, which ended as a goalless draw, leaving Manchester United and Liverpool to share the shield. Greenhoff finished the 1977–78 campaign with six goals in 28 games. He finished 1978–79 as the club's top-scorer with seventeen goals, and supporters voted him Player of the Year. He also played in the 1979 FA Cup Final, which Arsenal won 3–2 thanks to a last minute Alan Sunderland goal. Though this was as close as manager Dave Sexton would come to a major honour as United boss, Sexton did sign Joe Jordan, who would form a successful partnership with Greenhoff. United finished second in 1979–80, two points behind Liverpool, as Greenhoff was limited to just five games due to injury. He played twelve games in 1980–81.

Later career
He was allowed to join Crewe Alexandra in December 1980. Greenhoff had scored a total of 36 goals in 123 appearances (including 4 substitute appearances) for Manchester United. He was reunited with former boss Tony Waddington, and though Crewe were a struggling Fourth Division side, Greenhoff managed four goals in eleven league games. He moved to North American Soccer League side Toronto Blizzard in March 1981, then led by Keith Eddy. The "Blizzard" were a poor side, and finished bottom of their division, despite Greenhoff scoring six goals in 24 games.

He returned to Stoke-on-Trent to sign for Port Vale in August 1981. He played 38 games in 1981–82, but scored just three goals for John McGrath's Fourth Division side. Greenhoff struck twice in seventeen games in 1982–83. Notably, on 6 November, local paper The Sentinel reported a "Heavy defeat for Port Vale" after Vale were 3–0 down to Rochdale at Spotland at half-time, only for Greenhoff to inspire a fightback for the "Valiants", and help the club to a 3–3 draw.

He left Vale Park in March 1983 to join Rochdale, where he was appointed player-manager. He played a total of seventeen games for the "Dale", but did not find the net. Under his management, the club avoided the re-election zone in 1982–83, but again struggled in 1983–84, and he left the club in March 1984, later returning to Vale Park for a brief spell as coach and assistant manager.

Style of play
Greenhoff could play with both feet, and was known for his dangerous runs into the opposition penalty box. He was a talented and skilful player, who had great positional strength and a tremendous volley. He liked to play "no-look" passes.

Post-retirement
Greenhoff suffered a financial crisis following a failed insurance venture, and took up work in a warehouse. The crisis came about after discovering that his friend and business partner of nine years had been conning him out of large sums of money.

Career statistics

Playing statistics
Source:

Managerial statistics

Honours
Leeds United
Football League Cup: 1967–68
Inter-Cities Fairs Cup: 1967–68

Stoke City
Football League Cup: 1971–72
Watney Cup: 1973

Manchester United
FA Cup: 1976–77
FA Charity Shield: 1977 (shared)

References

External links

1946 births
Living people
Footballers from Barnsley
English footballers
Association football forwards
England under-23 international footballers
Leeds United F.C. players
Birmingham City F.C. players
Stoke City F.C. players
Manchester United F.C. players
Crewe Alexandra F.C. players
English expatriate footballers
Expatriate soccer players in Canada
Toronto Blizzard (1971–1984) players
Port Vale F.C. players
Rochdale A.F.C. players
English Football League players
North American Soccer League (1968–1984) players
Association football player-managers
English football managers
Rochdale A.F.C. managers
English Football League managers
Association football coaches
Port Vale F.C. non-playing staff
English Football League representative players
English expatriate sportspeople in Canada
FA Cup Final players